Charles McDonald (born 11 June 1935) is a former Irish Fine Gael politician. He was a Senator from 1961 to 1973 and from 1977 to 1992, a Teachta Dála (TD) from 1973 to 1977, and a Member of the European Parliament (MEP) from 1973 to 1979.

Biography
From County Laois, he was a farmer before entering politics, he was elected in 1961 to the 10th Seanad on the Agricultural Panel, and held his Seanad seat until the 1973 general election, when he was elected to the 20th Dáil for the Laois–Offaly constituency (which he had contested unsuccessfully in 1969). He lost his seat in Dáil Éireann at 1977 general election, and although he stood in the next four general elections, he never returned to the Dáil.

However, after his 1977 defeat, he was elected to the 14th Seanad (again on the Agricultural Panel), and remained in the Seanad until his defeat at the 1993 election, serving as Cathaoirleach of the 15th Seanad (1981–82) and as Leas-Chathaoirleach in the 16th and 18th Seanad. He stood again at the 1997 election to the 21st Seanad, this time on the Administrative Panel, but was not elected.

McDonald was appointed as a Member of the European Parliament in 1973, one of Ireland's first delegation of MEPs, who at that time MEPs were appointed as a delegation from by national parliaments. He was re-appointed to the second and third delegations, but at the first direct election in 1979, he did not win a seat when he stood in the Leinster constituency. He did not contest the 1984 European election, and was unsuccessful again at the 1989 European election.

References

1935 births
Living people
Fine Gael TDs
Local councillors in County Laois
Cathaoirligh of Seanad Éireann
Members of the 10th Seanad
Members of the 11th Seanad
Members of the 12th Seanad
Members of the 20th Dáil
Members of the 14th Seanad
Members of the 15th Seanad
Members of the 16th Seanad
Members of the 17th Seanad
Members of the 18th Seanad
Members of the 19th Seanad
Politicians from County Laois
Fine Gael MEPs
MEPs for the Republic of Ireland 1977–1979
MEPs for the Republic of Ireland 1973–1977
MEPs for the Republic of Ireland 1973
Fine Gael senators
Irish farmers